Sainte-Croix-du-Mont is an Appellation d'origine contrôlée (AOC) for sweet white wine from the Bordeaux wine region in France.

Geography

The wine-growing area is located in the Aquitaine region of France and surrounds the commune of Sainte-Croix-du-Mont in the Gironde department. It is located on the right bank of the Garonne river, in the Entre-Deux-Mers subregion of Bordeaux.

Appellation

It has a good geographical location for producing wine affected by noble rot as many of the vineyards grow next to rivers and are therefore likely to be affected by the Botrytis cinerea fungus in the autumn. The noble rot increases the sugar content, acidity, and glycerol content of the grape clusters.

The wines from Sainte-Croix-du-Mont are similar in style to the more famous wines from Sauternes on the other side of the Garonne. In similarity to Sauternes, they can be kept for several decades.

The Syndicat Viticole de Sainte-Croix-du-Mont (Wine-growers Union of Sainte-Croix-du-Mont) is responsible for managing the use of the Sainte-Croix-du-Mont AOC and has managed the related internet site since 2007.

References

External links
Official Website of the appellation Sainte-Croix-du-Mont

Bordeaux AOCs
Noble rot wines